Maynard is a Norman/Germanic/English surname meaning "strength, hardy". Notable people with the surname include:

 Abra K. Maynard (1803-1894), American farmer and politician
 Alan Maynard (1944–2018), British health economist
 Amory Maynard (1804–1890), Industrialist, founder of Maynard, Massachusetts
 Bill Maynard (1928–2018), English comedian and actor
 Brad Maynard (born 1974), American football punter and holder
 Brittany Maynard (1984–2014), American activist for assisted suicide
 Bruno Maynard (born 1971), French ice hockey player
 Charles Johnson Maynard (1845–1929), American naturalist and ornithologist
 Conor Maynard (born 1992), British singer
 David Swinson Maynard ("Doc" Maynard), American pioneer, first doctor in Seattle
 Diana Maynard, British computational linguist
 Don Maynard (1935–2022), American football player
 Dori J. Maynard (born 1958), President and CEO of the Maynard Institute (2008); daughter of Robert C. Maynard
 Edward Maynard (1813–1891), American firearms inventor
 Farnham Maynard, Australian Anglican clergyman and first president of the Council for Aboriginal Rights
 Finian Maynard (born 1975), world champion windsurfer
 Fred Maynard (1879–1946), Aboriginal Australian activist, founder of Australian Aboriginal Progressive Association (AAPA)
 Gray Maynard (born 1979), American mixed martial arts fighter
 Hannah Maynard (1834–1918), Canadian photographer
 Horace Maynard (1814–1882), Tennessee Congressman and U.S. Postmaster General
 Isaac H. Maynard (1838–1896), New York lawyer
 James Maynard (born 1987), British mathematician
 Jay Maynard (born 1960), computer programmer, "Tron man" 
 John Maynard (disambiguation), several people
 Joyce Maynard (born 1953), American author
 Kelvin Maynard (1987–2019), Dutch professional soccer player 
 Ken Maynard (1895–1973), American movie stuntman and actor
 Ken Maynard (cartoonist) (1928–1998), Australian cartoonist
 Kyle Maynard (born 1986), American speaker, author and athlete 
 Louis Maynard (1871–1940), French writer and historian
 Marjorie Maynard (1891–1975), British artist and farmer
 Mark R. Maynard (born 1972), West Virginia politician
 Matthew Maynard (born 1966), ex-cricketer
 Merv Maynard (-2017), Aboriginal Australian jockey, son of Fred and father of historian John Maynard 
 Nicky Maynard (born 1986), MK Dons F.C. striker
 Ralph Maynard Smith, (1904–1964) architect
 Richard Maynard (1832–1907), Canadian photographer
 Robert Maynard (disambiguation), several people
 Spike Maynard (1942–2014), Justice of the West Virginia Supreme Court of Appeals
 Thane Maynard, wildlife expert
 Tom Maynard, (1989–2012), English cricketer
 William H. Maynard (1786–1832), New York politician

Fictional characters:
 Christopher Maynard, fictional antagonist from the 1996 film, The Glimmer Man, played by Stephen Tobolowsky

See also
 John Maynard Smith (1920–2004), British theoretical evolutionary biologist and geneticist
 Julian Maynard Smith, performance artist, founder of Station House Opera, son of John Maynard Smith

References

English-language surnames
Surnames from given names